Prem Bahadur Singh is a Nepalese politician. He is the chairman of the Samajbadi Prajatantrik Janata Party, Nepal. He was previously a political leader of the Communist Party of Nepal (Unified Marxist-Leninist).

Singh won the Kalikot-1 seat in the 1999 parliamentary election as a CPN(UML) candidate. Singh got 10813 votes, defeating the Nepali Congress candidate Netra Bahadur Shahi.

Singh was expelled from CPN(UML) on the ground of supporting the monarchy. After the royal coup d'etat in February 2005, Singh was appointed Minister by King Gyanendra.

After the 2008 Constituent Assembly election, in which SPJPN won one Proportional Representation seat, Singh was selected to represent the party in the Constituent Assembly.

On July 3, 2009, Singh was appointed Minister for Law and Justice.

He was Minister for Water Supply and Sanitation until he resigned from his post in July 2016. He was sworn in for the same post in January 2017, again. He was the only member of his party in the parliament.

References 

Living people
Samajbadi Prajatantrik Janata Party, Nepal politicians
Communist Party of Nepal (Unified Marxist–Leninist) politicians
Government ministers of Nepal
Year of birth missing (living people)
Nepal MPs 1999–2002
Members of the National Assembly (Nepal)

Members of the 1st Nepalese Constituent Assembly
Members of the 2nd Nepalese Constituent Assembly